The men's pole vault event at the 1979 Summer Universiade was held at the Estadio Olimpico Universitario in Mexico City on 8 and 13 September 1979.

Medalists

Results

Qualification
Qualification height: 5.00 m

Final

References

Athletics at the 1979 Summer Universiade
1979